Akbiyeh is an archaeological site approximately   south of Sidon, northeast of Ain Kantarah in Lebanon. Material recovered is in the Museum of Lebanese Prehistory including four bifaces of Lower Paleolithic form along with a variety of material suggested to be Middle Paleolithic and Heavy Neolithic of the Qaraoun culture. These include a number of rectangular picks, rough cores and flakes in various conditions. The site is now under cultivation.

References

Heavy Neolithic sites
Neolithic settlements
Archaeological sites in Lebanon